The 2015 GT Sprint Series (known for sponsorship reasons as the 2015 Blancpain Sprint Series) was the third season following on from the demise of the SRO Group's FIA GT1 World Championship (an auto racing series for grand tourer cars), the second with the designation of Blancpain Sprint Series.

Calendar
The series started at the Circuit Paul Armagnac in Nogaro, France on 6 April and finished at Circuit Park Zandvoort in Netherlands on 11 October. Baku had been scheduled to host the final round of the season, but was replaced by Zandvoort for economic reasons. The seven-event calendar contained largely the same events as the previous season, with the addition of races at Moscow Raceway in Russia and Misano in Italy.

Entry list

Race results

Championship standings
Scoring system
Championship points were awarded for the first six positions in each Qualifying Race and for the first ten positions in each Championship Race. The pole-sitter in the qualifying race also received one point, entries were required to complete 75% of the winning car's race distance in order to be classified and earn points. Individual drivers were required to participate for a minimum of 25 minutes in order to earn championship points in any race.

Qualifying race points

Championship race points

Drivers' championships

Cup

Notes
1 – Markus Winkelhock was unable to score at Moscow, because he did not share his car with another driver. His regular teammate Nikolaus Mayr-Melnhof had to go home just before the event started.

Pro-Am Trophy

Silver Cup

Teams' championships

Cup

Notes
1 – Phoenix Racing was unable to score at Moscow, because Markus Winkelhock did not share his car with another driver. His regular teammate Nikolaus Mayr-Melnhof had to go home just before the event started.

Pro-Am Trophy

Silver Cup

See also
2015 Blancpain GT Series
2015 Blancpain Endurance Series

References

External links

Blancpain Sprint Series
Blancpain Sprint Series